Established in 2000, the Near East South Asia (NESA) Center for Strategic Studies is a U.S. Department of Defense institution for building relationships and understanding in the NESA region. The NESA Center supports the theater security cooperation effort of four Regional Combatant Commands: United States Central Command (USCENTCOM), United States Africa Command (USAFRICOM), United States European Command (USEUCOM), and United States Pacific Command (USPACOM) and is one of five regional centers that fall under the Defense Security Cooperation Agency. With its 21st Century security and academic focus, the NESA Center seeks to build on the strong multilateral relationships between the U.S government and its allies in the region; the Near East and South and Central Asian regional governments and their armed forces, by focusing on  broader multilateral approaches and capacity building  to address regional security issues and concerns. The NESA Center is located at Fort Lesley J. McNair in Washington, DC.

Mission statement

NESA Mission
To enhance security in the Near East and South Asia by building sustained, mutually beneficial relationships; fostering regional cooperation on security issues; and promoting effective communications and strategic capacity through free and candid interaction in an academic environment.

The NESA Center fosters open communication and educational opportunities for military and civilian representatives from the NESA region and other participating countries. Its academic environment uniquely facilitates a cross-cultural examination of the events, ideas, and challenges that shape this critical region.

The NESA Center has implemented programs on countering ideological support for terrorism, increasing and improving strategic communication and outreach to the region and supporting other strategic goals.

Achieving the NESA Mission
The following activities lead to achieving the core mission of developing a well-informed community of leaders and decision makers:
Sponsoring foundational seminars, primarily in Washington, D.C.
Reaching a larger audience of strategic thinkers and adding depth via a robust program of local and in-region engagement activities
Sustaining interest and promoting growth through networked outreach and alumni activities.

Countries in the NESA Region

Senior Leadership

The Center’s senior leadership come to NESA after long and distinguished careers with institutions such as the Department of State and the United States Military. These individuals contribute their knowledge and experiences to the Center’s mission on a daily basis.

Faculty
The NESA Center faculty represents a diverse assemblage of top-tier academics and expert practitioners from academia, diplomacy and defense. The NESA Center's faculty is composed of retired governmental, diplomatic and military leaders from the United States and the NESA region. Professors include men and women who have served as practitioners—ambassadors, government ministers, field- and flag-grade military officers, as well as traditional university faculty. The knowledge, experience and “whole of government” expertise of the NESA Center's faculty provide a deep pool of knowledge that gives its participants a focused and uniquely inclusive education that better enables them to engage in the myriad challenges facing the NESA region.

Outreach

Reaching Out to a Global Audience

Strategic communications and outreach are key regional center priorities. The NESA Center established an Outreach Office to coordinate all communication with:
Points of contact in US embassies overseas and foreign embassies in Washington
Participants prior to and during programs
Alumni after they leave Washington seminars
US government stakeholders, both in Washington and overseas
The interagency strategic communications community
Media, both domestically and in the region

The Center’s goal is to generate a dialogue that begins with the programs and continues after participants leave. NESA produces short, non-attributed executive summaries after seminars and trips. These reports, circulated on a limited basis to senior USG stakeholders, contain key/new facts or opinions gleaned from discussions with participants. The purpose of the summary is to help senior policymakers stay informed of views to which they would not otherwise be exposed. These executive summaries routinely generate responses from the 3- and 4-star general/flag officers and their civilian equivalents.

The NESA Center Director is leading the development of an active media outreach program, including travel to the Persian Gulf to meet with media in the region.

Foundation Programs
The NESA Center conducts various seminars on a near continuous basis year-round, examples of which are provided below:
Executive and Senior Executive Seminars
Executive and Senior Executive Combating Terrorism and Transnational Threats Seminars
Washington Seminar Series
Senior National Representatives Seminar
Embassy Orientation Program
Strategic Studies Network

Other Tailored Programs
U.S.-South Asia Leadership Engagement Program (NESA-Harvard)
U.S., Pakistan and Afghanistan Programs
Tunisian National Defense Institute

Other Regional Centers
NESA is one of five regional centers that fall under the Defense Security Cooperation Agency. The other centers include:
Asia-Pacific Center for Security Studies
George C. Marshall European Center for Security Studies
Africa Center for Strategic Studies
William J. Perry Center for Hemispheric Defense Studies

References 

United States Department of Defense agencies
Middle East
Near East
South Asia
Central Asia
Security studies